Miniara (also transliterated Minyara) is a village in Akkar Governorate, Lebanon, 9 kilometers east of the Mediterranean Sea, and 3 kilometers south of Halba. The population is between 7,000 and 10,000.

History
In 1838, Eli Smith noted  the village (named Menyarah),  whose inhabitants were Greek Orthodox, located west of esh-Sheikh Mohammed.

In 1856 it was named Menyarah on Kiepert's map of Palestine/Lebanon published that year,

Miniara is the birthplace of Ibrahim Beik El-Sarraf, the first member of the Lebanese parliament to represent the Christian seat of Akkar for 2 terms when Lebanon was still a French Mandate, and his younger brother "Afandi" Zeki EL Sarraf the first mayor in the municipality of Akkar in his village Miniara. Dr Yacoub El Sarraf--son of Ibrahim El Sarraf and a generous doctor who treated poor people free of charge and conducted many public services--was elected the Minister of Health in Lebanon. The current mayor of the village of Miniara is Toni Naim Aboud since 1998.

Demographics
The population is religiously diverse. A Christian village but of several different denominations with a majority of Greek Orthodox and including Melkite Greek Catholic, Maronite Catholic, and Evangelical.

Education
The majority of Miniara's teenage population is either in high school or has completed high school. 

Miniara has both private and public schools.

Private Schools
Saint Joseph's High School
Saint Joseph's Elementary School
Ecole Nationale Orthodoxe (E.N.O)
Modern School

Public Schools
Miniara Female Public School
Miniara Public High School
Miniara Boys Public School

References

Bibliography

External links
 Minyara, Localiban 

Al Mustaqbal - article on Fouad Ibrahim Sarraf accessed January 13, 2007.

Populated places in Akkar District
Christian communities in Lebanon